Nadeshiko may refer to:

 Dianthus superbus subsp. longicalycinus, a flowering plant native to Japan
 A feminine given name in Japan, after the flower
 Yamato nadeshiko, a Japanese term used to praise the idealized Japanese woman
 Nadeshiko Japan, the Japan women's national football team

Fictional characters
 Nadeshiko Kinomoto, a character in the manga and anime series Cardcaptor Sakura
 Nadeshiko Fujisaki, a character in the manga and anime series Shugo Chara!
 Nadeshiko, a character in the Japanese light novel and anime Inukami!
, a character in the manga series Laid-Back Camp
 Nadeshiko Yamato from the manga Kimi no koto ga Dai Dai Dai Dai Daisuki na 100-nin no Kanojo
 Yamato Nadeshiko (大和ナデシコ) the wrestling partner of Rainbow Mika

See also
 Yamato Nadeshiko (song), a 2006 single by Riyu Kosaka
 Martian Successor Nadesico, a 1996 anime
 The Wallflower (manga) (Japanese title: Yamato Nadeshiko Shichi Henge), a manga series